Heather McDonald (born 1970) is an American actress, comedian and author.

Heather McDonald or Mac Donald may also refer to:
Heather McDonald (playwright) (born 1959), American playwright, director, librettist, and professor
Heather McDonald (rugby union), Canadian rugby union player
Heather Mac Donald (born 1956), American political commentator, essayist, and attorney
Heather Lyn MacDonald, American film director and producer